Thomas Friedrich Zobel von Giebelstadt und Darstadt (1799 – 12 July 1869) was an Austrian military officer.

Zobel was born into a family of the lesser Austrian nobility. He studied in the military academy of Vienna and  distinguished himself in the riots in Lombardy-Venetia of 1848. On 30 April 1849 he was appointed Major General, becoming the governor of the fortress of Verona, where there was one of the largest Austrian garrisons in northern Italy.

On 12 May 1853 he was named a leutnant-feldmarschall in the Austrian army. He defended against the invasion of Lombardy-Venetia by a combined force from the Kingdom of Sardinia and Piedmont, and France, and fought in the battle of Palestro (1859, during the Italian Second War of Independence) as the Austrian commander, although the battle was lost.  He retired from the military in 1864 and died in 1869.

Bibliography 
 

1799 births
1869 deaths
Austrian generals
Austrian military personnel of the Italian Independence Wars
Place of birth missing
People of the First Italian War of Independence
People of the Second Italian War of Independence